Hyde Road is a section of the A57 road in Manchester, England.  The name may refer to:

Hyde Road Football Stadium, used by Manchester City 1887–1923
Hyde Road (speedway), a stadium used by Belle Vue Aces 1928–1987
Hyde Road railway station, open 1892–1958